Guernini is a town and commune in Djelfa Province, Algeria. According to the 1998 census it has a population of 4,038.

References

Communes of Djelfa Province
Djelfa Province